The Leffell School (formerly Solomon Schechter School of Westchester) is a K–12 private, co-educational, Jewish day school in New York, United States. It was established in 1966 by Max Gelb and operates on two campuses; a Lower School (K–5) in White Plains and an Upper School (6–12) in Hartsdale.

History

Founding 

Solomon Schechter School of Westchester was founded in 1966 with twenty-two students and two teachers in the basement of Temple Israel Center. Rabbi Max Gelb, the school's founder, guided the school with his wife, founding principal Leah Gelb. By the end of the 1970s, enrollment reached 150 and the kindergarten was housed in a converted home adjacent to the main building.  It is named after Solomon Schechter, who founded the United Synagogue of America and was the architect of the American Conservative Jewish movement.

Expansion in White Plains 
In 1979, with financial support from M. Mac Schwebel and others, the school leased the  Rosedale Elementary School campus on Dellwood Road in White Plains, and two years later purchased the campus. In 1980, Rabbi Gelb and Mrs. Gelb stepped down, and Dr. Elliot Spiegel was appointed headmaster. It was Dr. Spiegel who charted the school's future course, introducing innovative education programs and transforming Schechter Westchester into a premier conservative Jewish day school. In 1989, with support from Joseph S. Gruss, a fourth building was constructed on the White Plains campus to help accommodate the demands of Westchester's largest Jewish day school.

Name change 
On July 1, 2019, it changed its name to The Leffell School, after Lisa and Michael Leffell, the latter a past president of the school's board of trustees.

End of Carmel Academy 
In 2020, Carmel Academy in Greenwich, Connecticut announced that it would close down at the end of the school year. A letter from Carmel referred students to Leffell, stating that there would be integration of Carmel programs there, although Leffell stated that Carmel was simply closing and that it was not merging into Leffell.

Tuition 
Fifty percent of students at the school received tuition assistance in 2012.

Athletics 
The school participates in the New York State Public High School Athletic Association. The following sports are currently offered:

In November 2015, the Schechter Westchester varsity soccer team lost to Elmira Notre Dame in the NY State Class C Finals in Middletown. Prior to this, no Schechter Westchester athletic team had ever made it past the class C regional semi-finals.

Notable alumni 
 Jennifer Hyman, CEO and co-founder of Rent the Runway
 Nick Kroll, actor, comedian, writer and producer
 Rachel Kadish, fiction and non-fiction writer
 Andrew Goldberg, writer and producer
 Jason Schreier, author and journalist

References

External links 
 

Conservative Jewish day schools
Conservative Judaism in New York (state)
Jewish day schools in New York (state)
Jews and Judaism in Westchester County, New York
Private K-12 schools in Westchester County, New York
Schools in White Plains, New York
Educational institutions established in 1966
1966 establishments in New York (state)